Maurício Aparecido Maciel Leal (born 11 June 1987) simply known as Maurício Leal is a Brazilian footballer who plays as a centre-back for Campeonato Rondoniense club Porto Velho.

References

External links
 

1987 births
Living people
Brazilian footballers
Brazilian expatriate footballers
Expatriate footballers in Albania
Expatriate footballers in Indonesia
Clube Atlético Bragantino players
Oeste Futebol Clube players
Grêmio Barueri Futebol players
Nacional Futebol Clube players
FC Atlético Cearense players
Sriwijaya F.C. players
Flamurtari Vlorë players
Persipura Jayapura players
Mitra Kukar players
Association football defenders